Aleksandar Keljević (born 14 June 1989) is a Serbian former football midfielder.

References

External links
 
 Aleksandar Keljević stats at utakmica.rs 
 

1989 births
Living people
Sportspeople from Kragujevac
Association football midfielders
Serbian footballers
FK Javor Ivanjica players
FK Smederevo players
FK Radnički 1923 players
Serbian SuperLiga players